William Metcalf may refer to: 

 William Henry Metcalf (1885–1968), World War I soldier   
 William E. Metcalf (born 1947), American numismatist
 William W. Metcalf, professor of University of Illinois at Urbana Champaign
 William Metcalf (manufacturer) (1838-1909), American steel producer  
 William James Metcalf, researcher of communal groups